Dr Neil Hillman  (born 31 January 1960, Sutton Coldfield, England) is a British television and feature film sound designer and editor, notable for his work on the Oscar-winning film Lincoln, New York I Love You and Grace of Monaco. Hillman was awarded the World Medal for Sound Design at the New York Festival for the film The 13th Day in 2010 and in November 2010 was awarded the Royal Television Society award for Best Production Craft Skills for Sound Design and Mixing on the film Handle With Care.

Early life and education
Hillman began his career as an electronics engineer with American machine tool manufacturer Cincinnati Milacron. After completing his apprenticeship he graduated from the University of Aston in Industrial Electronics and Instrumentation in 1981, after previously studying Electrical and Mechanical Engineering at Matthew Boulton College and North Birmingham Polytechnic (now Birmingham City University). He completed his PhD by Practice within the University of York’s Department of Theatre, Film and Television (TFTV), researching Emotion in Sound Design under the supervision of Dr. Sandra Pauletto.

Career
After completing his foundation degree and apprenticeship in Electrical Engineering, Hillman joined the Midlands-based Central Independent Television in 1982 as a sound technician, working on all aspects of broadcast audio. He left Central TV in 1989 to work as a freelance location Sound Recordist, Dubbing Mixer and Broadcast Sound Supervisor. During this time he contributed regularly to long-running BBC TV series', including The Antiques Roadshow (where he introduced stereo location recording to the programme), travelled extensively overseas to record sound for programmes such as Tomorrow's World and Top Gear, and recorded and mixed choral music on location for Songs of Praise.

In 1999 Hillman was invited to join Optical Image, a growing UK video post-production company, in a new position as Head of Sound. Hillman set up the post-production sound department for a joint animation venture with Mike Young Productions, Butt Ugly Martians; a 26-part production where Hillman worked alongside Producer Bill Schultz, better known at this time for his role as a Producer on US animation hits The Simpsons and King of the Hill. Hillman was the Sound Designer and re-recording mixer for the entire Butt Ugly Martians series, collaborating with multiple-Emmy winning Sound Editor, Rick Hinson MPSE on episodes 1 and 2.

Between 2000 and 2001, he both location recorded and then audio post-produced a four-part series for Discovery, called Beyond The Horizon, which documented a year in the lives of a group of RAF pilots as they attempted to qualify for the elite Red Arrows display team. The year spent working alongside such excellence, Hillman later said, would irrevocably focus his determination and commitment to achieve similar levels of quality and professionalism in his own work.

Hillman left Optical Image in 2002 to form his own audio post-production studios, The Audio Suite. Between 2002 and 2012, The Audio Suite worked as preferred audio suppliers to All3Media, the UK's largest television Production Group, and they were also suppliers to the terrestrial channels of BBC, ITV, Channel 4 and Channel Five and the digital channels BBC Three, BBC Four, ITV4, National Geographic and Discovery. During this time Hillman and The Audio Suite worked on some of the most popular shows on UK television, including Channel Five's The Gadget Show, as well as contributing ADR (also known as dubbing) to prestigious TV dramas such as Spooks, Hustle and Survivors for the BBC.

Also during this period, Hillman passed the 500 IMDb (Internet Movie Database) credit mark and worked as the Sound Designer and Re-recording mixer on feature films including The 13th Day (for which he was awarded a World Medal for Sound Design at the 2010 New York Film Festival), The Mandrake Root, The Craftsman (a finalist in the 2013 New York Film Festival best soundtrack category), Handle With Care (the film earned two Royal Television Society awards: Best Production Skills for Hillman's soundtrack and Best Short Film), Money Kills, and contributed ADR services to film productions such as Director Steven Spielberg's Lincoln, (re-recording the dialogue of the character Tad Lincoln, played by Gulliver McGrath) for DreamWorks, New York I Love You, (re-recording Oscar-winning actress Julie Christie with Director Shekhar Kapur, who took the Directorial reins following the untimely death of the original Director Anthony Minghella) and Grace of Monaco.

In 2012, Hillman transitioned The Audio Suite from a large commercial work-for-hire post-production facility, with a large city-centre studio complex, to a smaller, bespoke Sound Design practice with in-house studios, where he currently works as a Broadcast Sound and Post-Production Consultant.

Current work
After transitioning The Audio Suite into a smaller and more agile Sound Design practice, two of Hillman's initial projects were the sound design and mixing of Film Director Pip Piper's musical documentary Last Shop Standing, featuring British musicians Paul Weller, Johnny Marr, Norman Cook, Clint Boon, Richard Hawley and Billy Bragg, which went on to earn a maximum 5-star review in Q magazine; and the sound design, sound editing and mixing of Director Lisle Turner's feature film Here And Now, with final mixing taking place at the legendary AIR studios (Associated Independent Recording), London.

He has recently contributed to a number of television shows and features, including Star Wars Rebels for Disney in the US, and Doctor Who, The Only Way Is Essex, Death Comes to Pemberley, Doc Martin and Peaky Blinders in the UK. His feature film work continues to include production sound mixing (as a location Sound Recordist) as well as audio post-production, as a Supervising Sound Editor / Sound Designer.

In 2015 Hillman was the Production Sound Mixer for the film Scott and Sid which went on to win several awards including Best British Film at the National Film Awards in 2019.

In 2017 he was the Dialogue Editor and Supervising Sound Editor / Sound Designer for the British independent film Finding Fatimah which was edited and pre-mixed at The Audio Suite and mixed for theatrical release at Pinewood Studios.

In 2018 he completed the sound design and mixing work on the second of Director Pip Piper's trilogy on record stores, vinyl records and independent music venues, The Vinyl Revival which featured Pink Floyd’s
Nick Mason, Portishead guitarist Adrian Utley and emerging band, The Orielles.

The final film of the series, Long and Winding Road premiered at Bush Hall, London on January 21, 2020 and featured Radiohead musician Philip Selway talking with small venue owners and artists including Nick Mason, Adrian Utley, IDLES, Nadine Shah, Gaz Coombes, Novelist, Richard Hawley, Talk
Show, Squid, Pip Blom and venues such as the 100 Club, The Boileroom, the John Peel Centre, the Trades Club, Bush Hall, the Brudenell Social Club, The Cookie, the Moles Club, The New Adelphi Club, The Leadmill, and 229 The Venue.

Through the Audio Suite's Sound Design practice, he is also regularly engaged by marketing agencies and commercial production companies to help with the promotion of national and international brands.

As well as his operational work of sound designing, editing and mixing, Hillman consults to Production Companies and Broadcasters on strategic planning for projects with complex workflow and delivery requirements, with clients such as the Olympic Broadcasting Services and UEFA. He worked as an Audio Mixer and as Commentary Control Liaison at the London 2012 Olympics and Paralympics, the Foreign Commentary Broadcast Liaison (CCR) for the 2013 UEFA Champions League Final, Sound Supervisor for Boxing at the 2014 XX Glasgow Commonwealth Games, Commentary Control Liaison at the Rio 2016 Olympics and as part of the team installing and operating the Commentary Switching Centre within the International Broadcast Centre (IBC) at the 2018 Gold Coast Commonwealth Games.

Under the Dr. Neil Hillman banner, his Consultancy practice aids a diverse range of clients including film and television Producers with viability and budgeting analysis for below-the-line shooting and post-production costs, as well as equipment manufacturers and systems suppliers at the product design, development and application stages of new industry products.

This advisory service extends to areas wider than film and television; consulting to a range of industry sectors on user interfaces (UI), the end-user experience and on creating more efficient workflow by embracing new ways of thinking about existing systems and production arrangements.

Writing and publications
In 1997 Hillman started writing articles regularly for the industry-leading audio magazine Studio Sound, as well as other industry titles including Audio Media, TVB Europe, Line Up and Stage and Screen, and occasionally for mainstream publications such as BBC Top Gear magazine.

In 2001, Hillman was asked to become a member of a small team of writers for a new professional audio magazine called Resolution, assembled by ex-Studio Sound Editor Zenon Schoepe. Hillman went on to contribute regularly to 'Resolution' magazine for over ten years, commencing with its first issue, writing on modern sound production and reviewing equipment.

His first book, Journeyman, was published in October 2013 and is a retrospective view of the most significant decade of digital development (2000 - 2010) in the professional audio-for-picture sector.

He has been featured in several newspapers regarding his outspoken views on the demise of regional production in the English Midlands, and sound quality for broadcast television; including The Birmingham Post and The Daily Telegraph.

In 2019 he contributed a Chapter to Routledge's Foundations in Sound Design and was subsequently invited to write a deeper study of innovative sound design techniques for the publisher. The book 'Sound for Moving Pictures: the Four Sound Areas' is scheduled for publication in January 2021.

Research and teaching
In 2010, Hillman commenced a part-time PhD by Practice within the University of York’s Department of Theatre, Film and Television (TFTV), researching Emotion in Sound Design under the supervision of Dr. Sandra Pauletto. His research involved the Emotion of Sound Design and how sound designers may determine and predict how an audience will react to certain audio stimuli when these are used to support and enhance moving pictures. He is a member of the TFTV Sound Design research group.

His PhD research resulted in three academic papers: 'The Craftsman: the use of sound design to elicit emotions' was presented at the University of Ulster's Cinesonika 3 conference in February 2013, and in July 2013 Hillman presented 'Organic and free-range sound design' at the University of York's International Sound Symposium. Both papers have subsequently been published, with 'Organic and free range sound design' published by Edinburgh University Press in edition 4.2 of The New Soundtrack  and ‘The Craftsman: the use of sound design to elicit emotions’ published by Intellect in edition 7.1 of The Soundtrack. In March 2016 ‘Audio Imagineering: Utilising the Four Sound Areas Framework for Emotive Sound Design within Contemporary Audio Post-production’ was published by Edinburgh University Press in edition 6.1 of The New Soundtrack.

As part of his wider academic work he is an enthusiastic supporter of new talent and regularly teaches undergraduate, postgraduate and Continuing Professional Development theory and practical sessions at the University of York. He has lectured in Film Production at Staffordshire University and the University of Gloucester; and in Sound for Film and Video at the School of Digital Media Technology at Birmingham City University (BCU), where he is a student mentor and a member of BCU's School of Digital Media Technology Industrial Advisory Board. As an invited international speaker, he has delivered workshops at SAE Institute Brisbane and Queensland University of Technology. He has also delivered talks for wider audiences in the UK: for the BFI, the Grierson Trust and the BBC Academy.

Awards and recognition
In 2008, Hillman sound designed the short film Steamy Windows for UK production company ST16, which won the New York Film Festival Gold Medal and the IVCA Gold Award. That same year, The Audio Suite were nominated for a high-profile Conch award in the TV Facility of the Year category 

In 2010, he was recognized by The Royal Television Society when he was bestowed with their 'Best Production Craft Skills' Award for his work on the feature film Handle With Care He also received the New York Festivals Film and Television Festival World Medal for his Sound Design on the feature film The 13th Day in 2010. and was a Finalist in 2013 for his work on The Craftsman.  Hillman has contributed to many other award-winning films and programmes.

Neil Hillman is a member of the prestigious Motion Picture Sound Editors (MPSE) society. He was proposed for membership by Rick Hinson, the President of the American academy of Motion Picture Sound Editors, a friendship from when they worked together on Butt Ugly Martians.

He is also a regularly invited member of the New York Festivals Grand Jury, working with other international award-winning Directors, Producers, Writers and Sound professionals to judge entries to the festival

Personal life
Hillman operates from studios in Birmingham, UK and Brisbane, Australia. He is married to Heather, who is the joint managing director of The Audio Suite and occasional voice actress.

He is a keen guitar player and composed, recorded and played the music for StorySmyth Tales - a series of six animated films for young children: Scruff Sheep, Pond Goose, Little by Little, Little Apple Goat, Just Like Tonight and Hurry Up And Slow Down.

He is an experienced sailor, motorcyclist and racketball player and has practised Wadō-ryū karate since his early teens. He is a Senpei at Team Blackbelt.

Selected work
Film
 Grace of Monaco (2014) ADR Mixer
 Officer Down (2013) ADR Recordist
 Lincoln (2012) ADR Mixer
 New York, I Love You (2008) ADR Mixer
 The Mandrake Root (2008) Sound Designer

Television
 Star Wars Rebels (2014) Sound Editor
 The Only Way Is Essex (2014) Sound Editor
 The Gadget Show (2004-2012) Sound Re-recording Mixer
 5th Gear (2004-2011) Sound Re-recording Mixer
 Butt Ugly Martians (2002) Supervising Sound Editor

References

1960 births
Living people
British sound designers
People from Sutton Coldfield
People from Moseley
Wadō-ryū practitioners
English male karateka